The captain general of the Church was the de facto commander-in-chief of the armed forces of the Papal States during the Middle Ages. The post was usually conferred on an Italian or other noble with a professional military reputation or (later) a relative of the pope. 

The parallel office of gonfalonier was more a formal and ceremonial honor than the responsibility of a tactical military leader. The office was at times made subordinate to temporary offices.

For example, Pope Callixtus III appointed Cardinal Rodrigo Borgia (Later Pope Alexander VI) as the chief and general commissary of the Papal Army. A number of such offices under many titles were used as ministers of war by popes, the captain general operated as a field commander under these offices. Pope Innocent XII removed both ranks and replaced them with the position of Flag-bearer of the Holy Roman Church, which later became hereditary in the Naro Patrizi.

It was traditional for the captain general to carry a baton of command blessed by the pope.

List of captains general

See also

Captain General, for similarly named ranks
Gonfalonier of the Church
Condottieri
Papal States

Notes

References
Chambers, D.S. 2006. Popes, Cardinals & War: The Military Church in Renaissance and Early Modern Europe. I.B. Tauris. .

Papal States military personnel
Military ranks
 
8th-century establishments in the Papal States
1691 disestablishments in the Papal States